Fazil Khan Sheyda – was an Iranian diplomat and poet in the Azerbaijani literature.

Notes

Notes
 Nəbiyev, Bəkir. XIX əsr Azərbaycan şeri antologiyası. Bakı: Şərq-Qərb, 2005. 86, 

1852 deaths
1783 births
Iranian emigrants to the Russian Empire
Azerbaijani-language poets
People from Tabriz
Iranian diplomats
18th-century Iranian poets
Persian-language poets
19th-century Iranian poets